The qualification group 4 for the 2010 European Men's Handball Championship includes the national teams of Croatia, Finland, Greece, Hungary and Slovakia.

Standings

Fixtures and results

References
 EHF Euro Events – Men's EURO 2010 (qualification)

Qualification, Group 4